= Camp Kudzu =

American nonprofit organization

- Formation: 1999; 25 years ago
- Founder: Parents of diabetics, health professionals, community leaders
- Type: Nonprofit
- Purpose: health and wellness
- Headquarters: Sandy Springs, Georgia
- Location: Georgia, US
- Coordinates: 33°52′11″N 84°32′13″W
- Region served: Georgia (US state)
- Method: summer camps, day camps, family camps, educational activities
- Owner: Camp Kudzu, Inc
- Executive Director: Robert G. Shaw
- Website: https://www.campkudzu.org/

Camp Kudzu is a nonprofit organization that provides camping-based educational opportunities for children and teens with Type 1 diabetes. The program is run within the state of Georgia.

Camp Kudzu was founded in 1999 by parents of diabetic children and medical professionals as means to support children in Georgia with Type 1 Diabetes. It held its first summer camp at Camp Twin Lakes in June 2000 and its first family camp in 2002. The following year, the program expanded to run camps at both Camp Twin Lakes and Camp Barney.
